Mukhtiar Ahmed Dhamrah is a Pakistani politician who had been a member of Senate of Pakistan, from March 2012 to March 2018, He is the current Information Secretary of Pakistan Peoples Party.

Political career
He was elected to the Senate of Pakistan as a candidate of Pakistan Peoples Party in 2012 Pakistani Senate election.

References

Living people
Pakistani senators (14th Parliament)
Pakistan People's Party politicians
Year of birth missing (living people)